The R711 is a Regional Route in Free State, South Africa that connects Clarens with Fouriesburg.

Route
The R711's northern terminus is in Clarens, at a junction with the R712, which goes north to Bethlehem and east to the Golden Gate Highlands National Park. The R711 heads south from Clarens before turning west to end at an intersection with the R26 at Fouriesburg.

References 

Regional Routes in the Free State (province)